Ballywillan Railway Station in County Longford was a former station on the Inny Junction to Cavan branch of the Midland Great Western Railway, Ireland. It opened in 1856 and closed in 1947. It is now a private residence.

References 

 Ordnance Survey of Ireland Discovery Series 1:50,000 map no. 34 shows the station locale.

List: B
Railway stations opened in 1856
Railway stations closed in 1947
1856 establishments in Ireland
1947 disestablishments in Ireland
Railway stations in the Republic of Ireland opened in the 19th century